The Warminster Line is a route of the SEPTA Regional Rail commuter rail system. It serves stations between its namesake town, Warminster, and Center City, Philadelphia. Half of the route is shared by other lines, including the Lansdale/Doylestown Line, West Trenton Line, Fox Chase Line, Chestnut Hill East Line, and Manayunk/Norristown Line. The great majority of trains continue as part of the Airport Line.

Route 
The Warminster Line uses the SEPTA Main Line between Center City and Glenside, where it branches off onto the Warminster Branch to Hatboro and Warminster. The tracks continue past Warminster to Ivyland and eventually to New Hope, where the New Hope Railroad runs heritage excursion trains.

The Warminster Line becomes a single-track line just north of Ardsley, but was once double-tracked as far north as Roslyn, the original northbound track being removed in 2010. A passing siding exists north of Willow Grove. There is also a second storage track at the Hatboro station and the line becomes double-tracked again as it approaches the terminus at Warminster station.

History 

The Warminster Line is a continuation of the Reading Company's suburban services over the Warminster Branch. The line was built between 1872–1874 and electrified as far as Hatboro in 1931. Passenger service beyond Hatboro ended in 1952. The Reading extended electrification and suburban service to Warminster on July 29, 1974.

With the Reading's final bankruptcy in 1976 Conrail took over the operation of the trains and ownership of the branch. The Warminster Branch was conveyed to SEPTA in 1979; SEPTA took over operation of the trains in 1983. A train crash occurred on July 1, 2006 in Abington Township injuring 38 and 6 crew members.

Beginning in 1984 the route was designated R2 Warminster as part of SEPTA's diametrical reorganization of its lines. Warminster Line trains operated through the city center to the Wilmington/Newark Line (then Marcus Hook) on the ex-Pennsylvania side of the system. The R-number naming system was dropped on July 25, 2010.  the majority of Warminster trains continue on to the Airport Line, though some peak hour weekday trains terminate at 30th Street Station.

On April 18, 2016, SEPTA launched positive train control on the Warminster Line, the first Regional Rail line to use the signal system which will enhance safety.

Potential for expansion beyond Warminster 

In a 1991 report, the Delaware Valley Regional Planning Commission ranked the line between Warminster and New Hope as having "medium potential" for reuse based on projected growth in population and employment in the region. It noted that SEPTA considered the line a "long range transit opportunity corridor."

Stations

The Warminster Line includes the following stations north of the Center City Commuter Connection; stations indicated with gray background area closed.

Ridership
Between FY 2008–FY 2018 yearly ridership on the Warminster Line has ranged between 2.3–2.7 million.

Notes

Footnotes

References

External links

The Pennsylvania Railroad Technical and Historical Society

 
SEPTA Regional Rail